Kid Icarus is an American indie rock group based in Dunmore, Pennsylvania, born of a solo recording project by Eric Schlittler. The band has released five full-length albums: Maps of the Saints, Be My Echo, The Metal West, Imaginary Songs & Aluminum Hits and American Ghosts.

History
After leaving the band Suetta, Eric Schlittler began producing cassette recordings using inexpensive home equipment. 
Calling his project Kid Icarus after the 1986 Nintendo Entertainment System video game of the same name,
Schlittler recorded Maps of the Saints in 1998 and 1999. The album contained lo-fi songs in the style of Guided by Voices, as well as psychedelic tracks influenced by Roky Erickson, Scott Walker, and Syd Barrett. 
Schlittler's next album, 2002's Be My Echo, included a mix of lo-fi rock and acoustic singer-songwriter music. 
A remastered reissue of Maps of the Saints followed in 2003. While Schlittler continued to write and record in his home studio, Kid Icarus grew as a project to incorporate his friends and other musicians in northeastern Pennsylvania. 
The Metal West, Kid Icarus's third album, was released in 2005, and marked Schlittler's first attempt at a hi-fi recording. The album featured contributions from guitarist Justin Marchegiani, bassist Ted Baird, drummer Thad Moyer, and keyboardist Chuck Keller. 
Spin magazine writer Lane Brown compared Schlittler's vocals to Elliott Smith, and called the band "Pavement on psychedelics." 
Mike Schiller of PopMatters described the album's lead track, "Beekeepers on the Edge of Town", as the "most obvious choice for a possible hit." Schiller added that the song sounded somewhat like The Hives, "if [singer] Howlin’ Pelle [Almqvist] was Dronin’ Pelle." Kid Icarus released a split 7-inch single with the band Das Black Milk in 2009.

Current line-up
 Eric Schlittler – guitar, vocals
 Joe Marchegiani – bass
 Justin Marchegiani – guitar
 Jeff Gilotti – drums

Discography

Albums
1996: The Angel Land Demos
1997: Try This at Home!
1998: Summer '98
1999: Maps of the Saints (re-issued 2003)
2002: Be My Echo
2005: The Metal West
2010: Imaginary Songs & Aluminum Hits
2011: American Ghosts

EPs
2003: Split ep w/ The Green Chair
2011: Ghost Town Feelings
2013: Split 12-inch w/ Cold Coffee

Singles
2009: "Kid Icarus" (released January 7)

Videography

DVDs
2006: Live from the Belly of a Dying City

Videos
2006: "The Murderess"

References

External links

Kid Icarus official website
 Video for "The Murderess" on YouTube

Alternative rock groups from Pennsylvania
Indie rock musical groups from Pennsylvania